M. D. Bartlett was a lawyer and a member of the Wisconsin State Senate from 1862 to 1863. He was a Republican. Bartlett was born in New York and lived in Durand, Wisconsin.

References

Republican Party Wisconsin state senators
People from New York (state)
People from Durand, Wisconsin
Wisconsin lawyers
Year of birth missing
Year of death missing
Republican Party members of the Wisconsin State Assembly